Rudolf Klaban (born 5 April 1938) is an Austrian middle-distance runner. He competed in the 800 metres at the 1960 Summer Olympics and the 1964 Summer Olympics.

References

1938 births
Living people
Athletes (track and field) at the 1960 Summer Olympics
Athletes (track and field) at the 1964 Summer Olympics
Athletes (track and field) at the 1968 Summer Olympics
Austrian male middle-distance runners
Olympic athletes of Austria
Place of birth missing (living people)
Universiade silver medalists for Austria
Universiade bronze medalists for Austria
Universiade medalists in athletics (track and field)
Medalists at the 1961 Summer Universiade
Medalists at the 1965 Summer Universiade